This is a list of schools in Bermuda. It includes aided schools, maintained schools and private schools.

Primary (Elementary) schools

Dalton E. Tucker Primary School
East End Primary School
Elliot Primary School
Francis Patton Primary School
Gilbert Institute
Heron Bay Primary School
Harrington Sound Primary School
Northlands Primary School
Paget Primary School
Prospect Primary School
Port Royal Primary School
Purvis Primary School
St David's Primary School
St George's Preparatory School
Somerset Primary School
Victor Scott Primary School
West End Primary School
West Pembroke Primary School

Middle schools
Clearwater Middle School
Dellwood Middle School
Sandys Secondary Middle School
TN Tatem Middle School
Whitney Institute Middle School

Senior (High) schools
Cedarbridge Academy
The Berkeley Institute

Special schools
Dame Marjorie Bean Hope Academy
The Education Center

Private schools
Bermuda Centre for Creative Learning
Somersfield Academy
Chatmore British International School
Bermuda High School for Girls
Bermuda Institute
Saltus Grammar School
Warwick Academy
Mount Saint Agnes Academy

See also
Bermuda College
Education in Bermuda

References

 
Schools
Bermuda
Schools
Schools